Neocollyris mannheimsi is a species of ground beetle in the genus Neocollyris in the family Carabidae. It was described by Mandl in 1954.

References

Mannheimsi, Neocollyris
Beetles described in 1954